Events from the year 1519 in art.

Paintings

 Girolamo Alibrandi paints the Presentation at the Temple.
 Hans Burckmair paints a panel picture of the Crucifixion, with St. George and the Emperor Heinrich on the wings.
 Albrecht Dürer paints St Anne with the Virgin and Child.
 Sebastiano del Piombo paints The Raising of Lazarus and Portrait of a Man, said to be Christopher Columbus.
 Raffaello Sanzio paints Pope Leo X with Cardinals Giulio de'Medici and Luigi de'Rossi.
 Titian finishes painting The Worship of Venus (Madrid, Museo del Prado).
 Bernard van Orley paints Joris van Zelle.
 Wen Cheng-ming paints Scholars at Leisure in a Precipitous Ravine.
 The portrait of Emperor Maximilian in Nürnberg is painted.

Births
April 17 - Frans Floris, Flemish historical painter (died 1570)
date unknown - Pedro de Villegas Marmolejo, Spanish sculptor and painter (died 1596)

Deaths
May 2 – Leonardo da Vinci, Italian architect, anatomist, sculptor, engineer, inventor, geometer, scientist, mathematician, musician and painter (born 1452)
July 2 - Francesco Bonsignori, Italian painter (born 1455)
November 30 - Michael Wolgemut, German painter and printmaker (born 1434)
date unknown
Alexander Bening, miniature painter of the Ghent-Bruges school and Netherlandish tradition (born unknown)
Domenico Fancelli, Italian sculptor working in Spain (born 1469)
Ambrosius Holbein, German and Swiss artist in painting, drawing and printmaking (born 1494)
Jan Joest, Dutch painter (born 1450/1460)
Antoine Juste, Italian sculptor (born 1479)
Juan de Flandes, Early Netherlandish painter who was active in Spain (born 1460)
Jan Polack, Polish-born German painter (born 1435)
Bartholomäus Zeitblom, German painter and the chief master of the school of Ulm (born 1450)

References

 
Years of the 16th century in art